Get Well Soon is a 1997 BBC television comedy series starring Matthew Cottle and Eddie Marsan. Lasting only 6 episodes, it was about the everyday lives of a group of patients, doctors, nurses and other staff at a tuberculosis hospital in 1947. The show, aired weekly between 2 November and 7 December 1997, was based on the meeting of Ray Galton and Alan Simpson, the writers of Steptoe and Son, in a Tuberculosis sanatorium in 1947. Although given a prominent early Sunday evening slot, the series failed to capture the public's imagination and only ran for one series.

Situation
One day in 1947, Roy Osborne (Matthew Cottle) is admitted to a TB sanatorium. He thinks he'll only be there for a few weeks, then finds that it could be several years before he can leave.

Cast
Matthew Cottle as Roy Osborne
Eddie Marsan as Brian Clapton
Anita Dobson as Mrs. Ivy Osborne
Samantha Beckinsale as Mrs. Howell
Patsy Rowlands as Mrs. Clapton
Hugh Bonneville as Norman Tucker
Robert Bathurst as Squadron Leader Fielding
Michael Troughton as The Padre
William Osborne as Jeffry Powell
Kate O'Toole as Sister Shelley
Julie Mullen as Lily

Episodes
The New Arrival (2 November 1997)
Snowbound (9 November 1997)
Tucker's Gambit (16 November 1997)
Sons, Mothers, Lovers and Others (23 November 1997)
The Whist Drive (30 November 1997)
Poison Ivy (7 December 1997)

Media releases
The complete series of Get Well Soon on DVD in one disc set was released by Simply Media on 21 September 2015.

External links

1997 British television series debuts
1997 British television series endings
1990s British sitcoms
1990s British comedy television series
BBC television sitcoms
English-language television shows
Television series created by Ray Galton
Television series set in the 1940s